Vincent Deon Butler (born January 4, 1986) is a former American football wide receiver. He was drafted by the Seattle Seahawks in the third round of the 2009 NFL Draft. He played college football at Penn State.

College career

After redshirting as a freshman at Penn State without an athletic scholarship as a defensive back., Butler rose to the top of the depth chart alongside Derrick Williams to provide a solid deep threat for quarterbacks Michael Robinson and Anthony Morelli. During his freshman season, Butler broke four school freshman records: season receptions (37), receiving yards in a game (125, versus Wisconsin), season yards (691), and touchdown catches (9). Butler also holds the single-game receiving yards record with 216 yards on 11 receptions against Northwestern on September 30, 2006. He finished 2007 with 47 receptions for 633 yards and 4 touchdowns. He had a season-high 7 catches for 93 yards and a touchdown in Penn State's 38–7 blowout win over Wisconsin. In the 2008 season, Butler caught 47 passes for 810 yards and seven touchdowns. He caught eight passes for 105 yards against Michigan.

Butler was a record-setting receiver for Coach Joe Paterno's Nittany Lions. Butler passed Bobby Engram to become Penn State's all-time receptions leader in November of his senior season against the Indiana Hoosiers.

Professional career

2009 NFL Combine

Seattle Seahawks
The Seattle Seahawks traded up to select Butler in the 3rd round (91st overall) of the 2009 NFL Draft. They traded the Philadelphia Eagles a 5th- and 7th-round pick plus a 3rd-round pick in 2010 in order to position themselves to select Butler. The team's interest in Butler reportedly stemmed, in part, from conversations with Butler's college teammate, Aaron Maybin, during a pre-draft interview in Seattle. He signed a four-year, $3.2 million contract with the team on July 24, 2009. He received a $680,750 signing bonus.

2010 season
He got his first receiving touchdown on September 12, 2010, against the San Francisco 49ers. It was his only catch of the game and it was for 13 yards. His second touchdown came against the Chicago Bears. After Deion Branch was traded to the New England Patriots Butler was named a starter, only to be replaced in the starting line-up several weeks later by teammate Ben Obomanu. He was put on injured reserve after breaking his leg during a touchdown catch against the 49ers in week 14.

2011 season
Butler started the season on the Physically Unable to Perform list. He played in the final four games of the season.

2012 season
Butler played in all four preseason games with the Seahawks, but was waived on August 31, 2012, as part of the final roster cuts from 75 to 53 players. On December 15, 2012, the Seahawks signed Butler after clearing a physical.

San Diego Chargers
Butler signed with the San Diego Chargers on April 8, 2013. On August 25, 2013, he was cut by the Chargers.

Personal
Butler earned a Bachelor of Arts in Crime, Law & Justice from Penn State in 2008. He has mentioned being interested in a career in forensic science after football. Butler spent the summer of 2008 as an intern with the Philadelphia Police Department's Crime Scene Unit, observing several homicide crime scenes, and augmenting his degree with valuable field experience. He currently resides in Atlanta, Georgia.

References

External links

 Deon Butler Talks At Indy, The Morning Call, February 20, 2009
 Radio interview: Deon Butler, Dave Mahler Show, KJR-AM, July 31, 2009.
Former Nittany Lion Butler makes leap from NFL to cyber forensics, June 12, 2020. 

1986 births
Living people
American football wide receivers
Penn State Nittany Lions football players
People from Woodbridge, Virginia
Players of American football from Virginia
San Diego Chargers players
Seattle Seahawks players